The Take the Crown Stadium Tour was a concert tour by British singer-songwriter Robbie Williams in promotion of his ninth studio album Take the Crown The tour was his first solo tour since the Close Encounters Tour (2006). In July 2013, the tour ranked 35th on Pollstar's annual "Top 100 Mid Year Worldwide Tours". It earned $20 million from nine shows.

Opening acts
 Olly Murs

Setlist
"Hey Wow Yeah Yeah"
"Let Me Entertain You" (contains elements of "I Want to Take You Higher")
"Monsoon"
"Not Like The Others"
"Minnie The Moocher"
"Kids" (performed with Olly Murs)
"Sin Sin Sin"
"Bodies"
"Come Undone" (contains elements of "Walk on the Wild Side" and "Never Forget")   
"Everything Changes" 
"Strong"
"Gospel"
"Be a Boy" (contains elements of "Use Somebody")
"Millennium" 
"Better Man"
"Sexed Up"                
"Me and My Monkey"
"Candy" (contains elements of "Billie Jean" and "Blitzkrieg Bop" )
"Hot Fudge" (contains elements of "Listen to the Music") / "Rudebox" (contains elements of "Vogue")
"Rock DJ" 
Encore
"Feel"
"She's the One"
"Angels"

Tour dates

DVD release
In July 2013, it was revealed the concert at the Tallinn Song Festival Grounds in Tallinn, Estonia will be live-streamed in numerous cinemas in Europe. Believed to be called "The Experience: Live from Tallinn", a trailer for the event was released on Williams' YouTube channel. Footage for the trailer was obtained from his shows at Wembley Stadium. Also featured on the channel are behind the scenes vignettes for each concert location. On 5 December 2014 the concert recorded in Estonia was released on commercial video release in both Blu-ray and DVD formats, Robbie Williams – Live in Tallinn.

Notes 
1.Data from study is collected from all worldwide concerts held between 1 January – 30 June 2012. All monetary figures are based in US dollars. All information is based upon extensive research conducted by Pollstar.

References

External links
Robbie Willams Official Website

Robbie Williams concert tours
2013 concert tours